Michael George Smith (23 April 1955 – 1 August 2014), also known by the on-air nickname of Smitty, was an English television and radio presenter, racing driver, pilot and businessman. He died on 1 August 2014 from complications of heart failure following major heart surgery. During the 1980s, he co-hosted BBC TV's Breakfast Time and was among rotating presenters of the music show Top of the Pops, broadcast on BBC One.

Radio career
Smith began his broadcasting career at Chelmsford Hospital Radio, before joining BBC Radio 1 in 1975 as a freelance producer and presenter. His work included promotions and production work for the Radio 1 Roadshow, Quiz Kid and most daytime network shows. As a standby DJ, Smith occasionally broadcast when live outside broadcasts failed. He joined London's Capital Radio in June 1978 and presented a variety of shows until July 1980, when he became the breakfast show presenter. He moved back to BBC Radio 1 in 1982, presenting the weekday early show from 6 to 7 am and a Saturday-morning show.

In 1983, Smith took over the weekday lunchtime show (11.30 am to 2 pm) until March 1984, when he briefly left to present BBC Breakfast Time. He returned to Radio 1 in May 1986, taking over from Mike Read on The Radio 1 Breakfast Show from 7.00 to 9.30 am, where he remained until almost exactly two years later when he left Radio 1 for good in 1988. Smith admitted to Chris Moyles in a BBC documentary aired in May 2010, When Moyles met The Radio 1 Breakfast DJs, he really missed being on the radio, but not television.

Television career
Smith's career as a television presenter included Thames TV's CBTV, BBC1 entertainment magazine and music chart shows Top of the Pops (1982-1988) Show Business (1983) and Friday's People (1985–87), Noel Edmonds' The Late, Late Breakfast Show (1984–86), That's Showbusiness (1989–96), and Julian Clary's Trick or Treat for ITV.

Smith was one of BBC TV's presenters at Live Aid in 1985. He helped found Comic Relief and presented several of the charity's TV shows.

Smith presented BBC TV's Railwatch, which was broadcast live for five days in February 1989. Other large outside broadcasts included Hospital Watch, Airport Watch and the BBC coverage of the Royal Tournament.

Smith decided not to sign the licence extension that would allow the BBC to repeat the Top of the Pops episodes that he presented, with the BBC continuing to respect his wishes following his death. As a result, episodes featuring Smith have been omitted from the repeat run on BBC Four.

Pilot
Smith was a qualified helicopter pilot. He and his partner (later his wife) Sarah Greene were injured on 10 September 1988 when the Robinson R22 Beta helicopter he was piloting (bearing the personal registration G-SMIF) crashed in Gloucestershire. Smith reported apparent unrecoverable loss of engine power whilst circling to reconnoitre an unfamiliar landing site. Both passengers survived, although Greene broke both legs and an arm, and Smith suffered a broken back and ankle. 

The Air Accidents Investigation Branch neither criticised nor exonerated Smith in relation to the crash (it being beyond its remit to do so), concluding simply that "examination of the helicopter [including flight control, fuel, engine control, dynamic systems and the engine itself] revealed no failure or unserviceability that could have resulted in a loss of rotor speed."

Aerial filming company
In 2004 Smith founded Flying TV, a company providing aerial filming services to broadcasters. As well as being managing director, Smith often acted as an aerial cameraman.

Motor racing
Driving from the age of 8, Smith raced at the age of 14 in grasstrack events, building his own cars. In 1972, aged 17, he passed his test and took up motorsports in racing, rallying and rallycross. In 1976, he progressed to Formula Ford 2000 with the Patrick Head-designed Sark. Smith was also a motorsport commentator, mainly at Brands Hatch where he also, age 21, ran the marketing operation. It was through that during this time he became interested in broadcasting.

While still broadcasting Smith raced in several British Touring Car Championship races, driving a newly homologated Sierra Cosworth in 1987, and then alongside Frank Sytner in 1988 with whom he often clashed in a BMW M3. He also won the Willhire 24 Hour at Snetterton in 1986, driving a Ford Escort RS Turbo. Veteran commentator Murray Walker remarked that Smith "guaranteed action by the bucket-load".

In 1989, Smith established a BTCC team known as Trakstar with Robb Gravett and Malcolm Swetnam.  They ran two Sierra Cosworths, which had been imported from the Australian Touring Car stable of Dick Johnson.
Gravett went on to become runner up in Group A, but Smith struggled with his recovery from the helicopter crash.  However, loss of a major sponsor in 1990 meant that only one car could be run, which was raced by Robb Gravett who became champion. Smith never raced competitively again.

Racing record

Complete European Touring Car Championship results

(key) (Races in bold indicate pole position) (Races in italics indicate fastest lap)

† Not eligible for points.

Complete British Saloon / Touring Car Championship results 
(key) Races in bold indicate pole position. Races in italics indicate fastest lap (1 point awarded – 1987–1989 in class)

† Endurance driver (Ineligible for points)

Complete World Touring Car Championship results
(key) (Races in bold indicate pole position) (Races in italics indicate fastest lap)

† Not eligible for points.

Personal life

Smith attended Ballyholme Primary School in Bangor, Northern Ireland during the early 1960s due to his father being relocated to Belfast by his employer, the Ford Motor Company.

Having spent a short period at Bangor Grammar School, Smith attended King Edward VI Grammar School, Chelmsford, where he was the resident DJ at the school Friday night sixth form disco. He married Sarah Greene in 1989, soon after their 1988 helicopter crash.

Smith died on 1 August 2014 from complications following major heart surgery. His wife of 25 years, TV presenter Sarah Greene, survives him.

References

External links
Mike Smith obituary by Gary Watkins on autosport.com
 

1955 births
2014 deaths
BBC Radio 1 presenters
British Touring Car Championship drivers
English racing drivers
English radio DJs
English radio presenters
English television presenters
People educated at King Edward VI Grammar School, Chelmsford
People educated at Bangor Grammar School
Top of the Pops presenters
BMW M drivers